Philipp Kohlschreiber and Mikhail Youzhny were the defending champions, but chose not to participate that year.

Michael Berrer and Rainer Schüttler won in the final 7–5, 3–6, [10–8], against Scott Lipsky and David Martin.

Seeds

Draw

Draw

External links
Draw

Doubles